Andrew Abiola Omobamidele (born 23 June 2002) is an Irish professional footballer who plays as a defender for  club Norwich City and the Republic of Ireland national team.

Early life
Omobamidele was born in Leixlip, County Kildare, to an Irish mother and a Nigerian father. As a youth, he played for the Dublin District Schoolboys League representative side alongside fellow future Irish international Gavin Bazunu. He has a sister named Fiona

Club career
On 23 December 2020, Omobamidele signed a new professional contract with Norwich City.

He made his debut for Norwich on 16 January 2021 as a substitute in a 2–1 Championship league win against Cardiff City.
Omobamidele's first start for Norwich was on in a 1–1 draw to Preston North End on 2 April 2021, when he played the full 90 minutes and was awarded Man of the Match. On 11 September 2021, he made his Premier League debut, playing the full 90 minutes in a 1–0 loss to Arsenal at the Emirates Stadium. On 31 October 2021, Omobamidele scored his first Premier League goal, which was also his first goal in senior football, heading home the equaliser from a corner in an eventual 2–1 loss to Leeds United at Carrow Road.

International career
On 24 May 2021, Omobamidele received his first call up to the Republic of Ireland senior squad for the summer friendlies against Andorra and Hungary.

He made his international debut on 1 September 2021, as a 36th minute substitute for the injured Dara O'Shea in a 2022 World Cup qualifier against Portugal at the Estádio Algarve in Faro.

Career statistics

Club

International

Honours
Norwich City
EFL Championship: 2020–21

References

External links

2002 births
Living people
People from Leixlip
Irish people of Nigerian descent
Irish sportspeople of African descent
Association footballers from Dublin (city)
Republic of Ireland association footballers
Association football midfielders
Republic of Ireland youth international footballers
Republic of Ireland international footballers
Premier League players
Norwich City F.C. players
English Football League players
Republic of Ireland expatriate association footballers
Black Irish sportspeople